Belleydoux is a commune in the Ain department in eastern France.

Geography
Belleydoux is situated at the southernmost end of the Hautes-Combes in the Jura mountains, and lies in the Semine valley, a tributary of the Rhône via the Valserine river. The village is overlooked by the Roche Fauconnière cliff.

Population

Notable people
 

Gabriel Taborin (1799–1864), religious Brother and founder

See also
Communes of the Ain department

References

Communes of Ain
Ain communes articles needing translation from French Wikipedia